Rocky Mount is an unincorporated community in Meriwether County, in the U.S. state of Georgia.

History
The first permanent settlement at Rocky Mount was made in the 1830s. A post office called Rocky Mount was established in 1835, and remained in operation until 1909.

The Georgia General Assembly incorporated Rocky Mount as a town in 1877. The town's municipal charter was repealed in 1995.

References

Former municipalities in Georgia (U.S. state)
Unincorporated communities in Meriwether County, Georgia
Unincorporated communities in Georgia (U.S. state)
Populated places disestablished in 1995